Anthony Weston (born 17 September 2003) is an English professional footballer who plays as a forward for Cove Rangers, on loan from Rangers. He has had loan spells at Partick Thistle.

Career
After scoring fourteen goals in the Blackpool youth team in the first part of the 2019–20 season, first-team manager Simon Grayson invited Weston to travel with the squad to Ipswich Town on 23 November. He was taken out of school for the journey. He was then named on the bench in the Seasiders following match, a home tie against Scunthorpe United in the EFL Trophy on 27 November. He made his professional debut on 1 December, in the final minute of normal time of Blackpool's 3–1 victory over Maidstone United in the second round of the FA Cup.

Weston joined Rangers on 31 July 2020 on a three-year contract for an undisclosed fee, reported to be £250,000. He initially played for the club's youth team; however, he made his debut for Rangers by replacing Steven Davis as a 71st-minute substitute during a 3–1 win over Heart of Midlothian on 14 May 2022. He was loaned to Partick Thistle in July 2022. On 19 January 2023, Weston joined Scottish Championship club Cove Rangers on loan until the end of the season.

Career statistics

References

External links

2003 births
Living people
Footballers from Liverpool
Association football forwards
English footballers
Blackpool F.C. players
Rangers F.C. players
Lowland Football League players
Scottish Professional Football League players
Partick Thistle F.C. players

Cove Rangers F.C. players